The 77th Sustainment Brigade is a unit of the United States Army that inherited the lineage of the 77th Infantry Division ("Statue of Liberty"), which served in World War I and World War II. Its headquarters has been at Fort Dix, New Jersey, since its predecessor command, the 77th Regional Readiness Command, was disestablished in 2008 from Fort Totten in Bayside, Queens, New York. Soldiers from the 77th have served in most major conflict and contingency operations since World War II.

The division is nicknamed the "Statue of Liberty Division"; the shoulder patch bears the Statue of Liberty in gold on a blue isosceles-trapezoid shape. U.S. Marines on Guam nicknamed them the "77th Marine Division".

The Clearview Expressway in Queens, New York, is named the "U.S. Army 77th Infantry Division Expressway", honoring the division and its successor commands.

World War I

Activated: 18 August 1917 Camp Upton in Yaphank, New York.
Operations: Meuse-Argonne, Oise-Aisne.

The 77th Infantry Division consisted initially of draftees, mostly from New York City. They trained at Camp Upton in Yaphank, New York, in the central part of Suffolk County, Long Island; the camp is now Brookhaven National Laboratory.

It was the first American division composed of draftees to arrive in France in World War I, landing in April 1918; overall, it was the seventh of 42 divisions to reach the Western Front. The division fought in the Battle of Château-Thierry on 18 July 1918 and later in the Meuse–Argonne offensive, the largest battle in the history of the United States Army, from late September until the Armistice with Germany on November 11, 1918. During its service in France, the 77th Division sustained 10,194 casualties: of these 1,486 men were killed and another 8,708 were wounded.

The division, after serving on occupation duties for the next few months, returned to the United States in April 1919 and was deactivated at Camp Upton later that month.

The 153rd Infantry Brigade consisted of the 305th Infantry Regiment, 306th Infantry Regiment, and 305th Machine Gun Battalion. The brigade was initially commanded by Brigadier General Edmund Wittenmyer.

The 154th Infantry Brigade was composed of the 307th and 308th Infantry Regiments and the 306th Machine Gun Battalion. The brigade's inaugural commander was Brigadier General Evan M. Johnson.

While the division had been recruited as a National Army unit from the New York City area, attrition and replacements had complicated the complexion of the unit. For example, the 40th Division had been converted into a "depot division" in August 1918 to equip, train, and forward replacements to other units, and in the process, Company L of the 160th Infantry, part of the California National Guard, had supplied many of its original men to Company K of the 307th Infantry as replacements.

The "Lost Battalion" of World War I fame was composed of six companies of the 308th Infantry Regiment and one from the 307th Infantry Regiment.

 77th Division Commanders:
 Maj. Gen. J. Franklin Bell (18 August 1917)
 Brig. Gen. Evan M. Johnson (4 December 1917)
 Maj. Gen. G. B. Duncan (8 May 1918)
 Brig. Gen. Evan M. Johnson (20 July 1918)
 Brig. Gen. Evan M. Johnson (19 August 1918)
 Maj. Gen. Robert Alexander (27 August 1918)

Order of battle

 Headquarters, 77th Division
 153rd Infantry Brigade
 305th Infantry Regiment
 306th Infantry Regiment
 305th Machine Gun Battalion
 154th Infantry Brigade
 307th Infantry Regiment
 308th Infantry Regiment
 306th Machine Gun Battalion
 152nd Field Artillery Brigade
 304th Field Artillery Regiment (75 mm)
 305th Field Artillery Regiment (75 mm)
 306th Field Artillery Regiment (155 mm)
 302nd Trench Mortar Battery
 307th Machine Gun Battalion
 302nd Engineer Regiment
 302nd Field Signal Battalion
 Headquarters Troop, 77th Division
 302nd Train Headquarters and Military Police
 302nd Ammunition Train
 302nd Supply Train
 302nd Engineer Train
 302nd Sanitary Train
 305th, 306th, 307th, and 308th Ambulance Companies and Field Hospitals

Interwar period

The division was reconstituted in the Organized Reserve on 24 June 1921, allotted to the Second Corps Area, assigned to the XII Corps and allotted to the southeastern portion of the state of New York, particularly Long Island and the New York City area. The headquarters was initiated on 1 July 1921.

World War II

 Ordered into active military service: 25 March 1942, Fort Jackson, South Carolina
 Trained at Camp Hyder, California in 1943
 Overseas: 24 March 1944
 Campaigns: Western Pacific, Leyte, Ryukyus
 Distinguished Unit Citations: 16
 Awards: Medal of Honor: 6; Distinguished Service Cross: 19; Distinguished Service Medal: 2; Silver Star: 335; Legion of Merit: 22; Soldier's Medal: 25; Bronze Star: 4,433; Air Medal: 4
 Commanders:
 Maj. Gen. Robert L. Eichelberger (March–June 1942)
 Maj. Gen. Roscoe B. Woodruff (June 1942 – May 1943)
 Maj. Gen. Andrew D. Bruce (May 1943 – 27 February 1946)
 Chaplain: Fray Angélico Chávez
 Inactivated: 15 March 1946 in Japan

Order of battle
 Headquarters, 77th Infantry Division
 305th Infantry Regiment
 306th Infantry Regiment
 307th Infantry Regiment
 Headquarters and Headquarters Battery, 77th Infantry Division Artillery
 304th Field Artillery Battalion
 305th Field Artillery Battalion
 306th Field Artillery Battalion
 902nd Field Artillery Battalion
 302nd Engineer Combat Battalion
 302nd Medical Battalion
 77th Cavalry Reconnaissance Troop (Mechanized)
 Headquarters, Special Troops, 77th Infantry Division
 Headquarters Company, 77th Infantry Division
 777th Ordnance Light Maintenance Company
 77th Quartermaster Company
 77th Signal Company
 Military Police Platoon
 Band
 77th Counterintelligence Corps Detachment

The 77th Infantry Division landed in Hawaii, 31 March 1944, and continued training in amphibious landings and jungle warfare. Elements began to leave Hawaii, 1 July 1944, for the amphibious assault on Guam. Attached to III Amphibious Force, the 77th made an assault landing on Guam, 21 July 1944. After taking over defense of the beachhead, the division drove north to seize Mount Tenjo and effected junction with the 3d Marine Division, linking the northern and southern bridgeheads, 23–29 July. It continued to drive north, and dislodged the enemy from positions at Barrigada town and mountain, 4 August, resistance ending on 8 August. With Guam recaptured, the 77th sailed for New Caledonia, but plans were changed en route and it was directed to proceed to Leyte. The division landed on the east coast of Leyte, 23 November 1944, and was attached to XXIV Corps, Sixth Army. After a short period of training and combat patrolling in the Corps' rear, 23 November – 6 December, it landed at Ipil and fought up the east coast of Ormoc Bay to seize Ormoc on 10 December. Attacking north, astride Highway No. 2, the division secured Valencia and the Libungao-Palompon road junction. Mopping up operations continued through January 1945 to 5 February 1945.

The next combat assignment was Okinawa. In late March (26–29), the division made 15 landings, securing Kerama Retto and Keise Shima for the assault on Okinawa. Riding at sea, 1–15 April 1945, it suffered casualties from enemy suicide attacks, and prepared for the assault landing on Ie Shima. On 16 April 1945, the 77th landed on Ie Shima, captured the airfield, and engaged in a bitter fight for "Government House Hill" and "Bloody Ridge." It was in this operation that Ernie Pyle was killed. On April 25 it left Ie Shima for Okinawa, relieving the 96th Division on 1 May 1945. Fighting its way slowly against extremely heavy Japanese resistance, the division drove to Shuri in conjunction with the 1st Marine Division, occupying it 29–31 May. In June the division covered the right flank of XXIV Corps and "sealed" Japanese cave positions. In July the division moved to Cebu, Philippine Islands, and prepared for the anticipated invasion of Japan (Operation Downfall). On 6 and 9 August 1945, the U.S. dropped atomic bombs on Hiroshima and Nagasaki, forcing the surrender of Japan and thereby cancelling Operation Downfall. The division landed in Japan in October 1945 for occupation duty, and was inactivated a few months later on 15 March 1946.

Casualties

Total battle casualties: 7,461
Killed in action: 1,449
Wounded in action: 5,935
Missing in action: 76
Prisoner of war: 27

21st century

Five soldiers from the 77th lost their lives at the World Trade Center in the September 11 attacks, while serving in their civilian duties.

The lineage of the 77th Infantry Division is perpetuated today by the 77th Sustainment Brigade, a unit of the Army Reserve, with its headquarters at Fort Dix, N.J. In 2011, the brigade deployed to Iraq in support of Operation New Dawn. The brigade headquarters was stationed in Balad, Iraq and held logistical responsibility for the re-posturing of forces in northern Iraq. The unit's motto is "Liberty Warriors".

See also 
Desmond Doss, soldier of the 77th who received the Medal of Honor during the Battle of Okinawa

References
 Notes

 Bibliography
 {{ACMH| article = The Army Almanac: A Book of Facts Concerning the Army of the United States U.S. Government Printing Office | url = http://www.history.army.mil/html/forcestruc/cbtchron/cbtchron.html}}
 
 Myers, Max. (ed.) Ours to Hold It High: The History of the 77th Infantry Division in World War II by Men Who Were There. Washington, D.C.: Infantry Journal Press, 1947.
https://archive.org/stream/OursToHoldItHigh#page/n1/mode/2up

Further reading
 Adler, Julius Ochs (ed.). History of the Seventy Seventh Division, August 25th. 1917 - November 11th. 1918. New York: The 77th Division Association, 1919. Pages 199-207 are devoted to a description of the "Lost Battalion".
 Klausner, Julius Jr. Company B, 307th Infantry: Its History, Honor Roll and Company Roster. New York: Burke-Kelly American Legion Post No. 172, 1920.
 McKeogh, Arthur. The Victorious 77th Division (New York’s Own) in the Argonne Fight. NY: John H. Eggers, 1919.
 Rainsford, Walter Kerr. From Upton to the Meuse with the Three Hundred and Seventh Infantry. New York: Appleton, 1920. Rainsford was commander of Company M, and later of Company L, of the 307th. This book contains a detailed account of the "Lost Battalion" in Chapter X (pages 195-224). 
 Through the War with Company D, 307th Infantry, 77th Division. New York: 1919.
 Tiebout, Frank Bosworth. A History of the 305th Infantry. New York: 305th infantry Auxiliary, 1919. 
 Whittlesey, Charles W. and George G. McMurtry. "The Epic of the Lost Battalion". The New York Times'', 30 September 1928.

External links

WWII Pacific Theatre: Campaign in the Marianas – Guam, 21–25 July 1944 a publication of the United States Army Center of Military History
77th Memorial Grove, Fort Totten, Bayside, NY
U.S. Army 77th Infantry Division Expressway, Queens County, NYC
Ours To Hold It High: the history of the 77th Infantry Division in World War II

077th Infantry Division, U.S.
Military units and formations established in 1917
Military units and formations of the United States Army Reserve
77th Sustainment Brigade
Sustainment Brigades of the United States Army
Infantry Division, U.S. 077
United States Army divisions of World War I
1917 establishments in New York (state)